

UEFA Champions League

Porto

All times CET

Round of 16

Sporting CP

All times CET

Benfica

3rd Qualifying Round

Benfica played the 3rd qualifying round on 8 August (first leg) and 22 August (second leg), 2006, against Austria Wien and qualified to the group stage of the Champions League.

Group stage

All times CET

UEFA Cup

Portuguese teams entered the UEFA Cup in the 1st round, immediately after the two qualifying rounds. This year's teams in the UEFA Cup were Sporting de Braga, Nacional, and Vitória de Setúbal. Benfica eventually entered into the Round of 32 after achieving a 3rd-placed finish in its UEFA Champions League group.

First round

The 1st leg was played on 14 September 2006. The 2nd leg was played on 28 September 2006.

Group stage

Round of 32

The first leg was held on 14th or 15 February 2007, while the second leg was held on 22 February 2007.

1 On 7 February, the Italian Government ruled that Parma and Livorno's home fields did not meet requirements following riots held after an Italian Serie A match in Sicily. Livorno played its home leg behind closed doors on 14 February. Parma played its home leg behind closed doors on 22 February.
2 Transferred from UEFA Champions League group stage as third-place finishers in their groups.

Round of 16

The first leg will be held on 8 March 2007, while the second leg will be held on 14 or 15 March 2007.

Euro
Port